Francesco Vecellio (about 1475 – 1560) was a Venetian painter of the Italian Renaissance. He was the elder brother and close collaborator of the painter Tiziano Vecellio ("Titian"). 

Vecellio was born in Pieve di Cadore, in the Republic of Venice, in either 1475 or 1483; he was the elder brother and close collaborator of the painter Tiziano Vecellio ("Titian"). He was a soldier, and fought in battles at Vienna and at Verona. He then worked as a painter; in 1530 he painted the shutters of the organ of the church of San Salvador in Venice. From about 1534 he worked as a wood-engraver. He painted an Annunciation for San Nicola di Bari, now in the Gallerie dell'Accademia, along with Madonna and Child with Saint Jerome and Saint Dorothy (Glasgow).

He died in Pieve di Cadore in 1559 or 1560.

References

Further reading 

 Ettore Merkel, Francesco Vecellio's Organ Door Schutters in San Salvador, in Save Venice, 1995, pp. 22-27

1480s births
1560 deaths
People from the Province of Belluno
15th-century Italian painters
Italian male painters
16th-century Italian painters
Painters from Venice
Italian Renaissance painters
Titian